Pardalophora haldemanii, known generally as the Haldeman's grasshopper or Haldeman's locust, is a species of band-winged grasshopper in the family Acrididae. It is found in North America.

References

Further reading

 

Oedipodinae